Wuzhong Road is a metro station on the Line 15 of the Shanghai Metro. Located south of the intersection of Guilin Road and Wuzhong Road in Minhang District, Shanghai, the station was scheduled to open with the rest of Line 15 by the end of 2020. However, the station eventually opened on 23 January 2021 following a one-month postponement. This is the Only Station on Line 15 where there are lights in the ceiling and the sign is white instead of black.

Gallery

References 

Railway stations in Shanghai
Shanghai Metro stations in Minhang District
Line 15, Shanghai Metro
Railway stations in China opened in 2021